(born April 6, 1976) is a Japanese sports writer from Tokyo, Japan.

Born without arms and legs due to a genetic disorder called tetra-amelia syndrome, Ototake is most notable for his 1998 memoir . Within a year of publication, the book became the third-best-selling book in Japan since World War II. It has since been translated into English.

After publishing his autobiography, Ototake became a successful sports journalist. In 2007, he took a job as a primary school (first through sixth grades) teacher at Suginami Dai-Yon Elementary School in Tokyo. He starred in the 2013 film, based on the events of his own life as a teacher, Daijōbu 3-Gumi, English title: Nobody's Perfect.

The Liberal Democratic Party considered recruiting Ototake to run in the summer 2016 upper house elections. However, in March 2016, the tabloid magazine Shukan Shincho reported that Ototake had affairs with five women since the birth of his eldest son in 2008. Ototake acknowledged and apologized for his actions.

See also
 Nick Vujicic, an Australian motivational speaker and another survivor of tetra-amelia syndrome.
Joanne O'Riordan, an Irish tetra-amelia syndrome survivor who has addressed the United Nations
Jennifer Bricker, an American acrobat born without legs

References

External links
  

1976 births
Living people
Japanese people with disabilities
Japanese amputees
People with tetra-amelia syndrome
Japanese memoirists
Sportswriters